Barsine fuscozonata is a moth of the family Erebidae. It was described by Hiroshi Inoue in 1980. It is found in Taiwan.

References

Moths of Asia
Nudariina
Moths described in 1980